Yohn is a surname. Notable people with the surname include:

Yohn Geiller Mosquera (born 1989), Colombian footballer
Erica Yohn (1930–2019), American actress
Frederick Coffay Yohn (1875–1933), artist and magazine illustrator
Rake Yohn (born 1975), member of the CKY Crew

See also
Yohan (disambiguation)